Pathania is a surname of Indian origin. It is also the name of a Rajput clan from northern India; the royal family of the Nurpur kingdom belonged to this clan.

Notable people 
People with surname Pathania, who may or may not be affiliated with the clan, include:
 Anant Singh Pathania, Indian army general and Maha Vir Chakra recipient
 Bhawani Singh Pathania, Indian National Congress politician
 Bhiguraj Pathania, Indian cricketer
 Diwesh Pathania, Indian cricketer
 Rakesh Pathania, Bharatiya Janata Party politician
 Raghbir Singh Pathania, Indian soldider in World War I
 Shivya Pathania, Indian model and television actress
 Sujan Singh Pathania, Indian National Congress politician
 Virender Singh Pathania, Directors General of the Indian Coast Guard
 Virendera Singh Pathania, Indian Air Force pilot, Vir Chakra and Vayusena Medal recipient

See also
 Pathankot, city in Punjab, India named after the clan

References

Social groups of India
Rajput clans of Himachal Pradesh
Indian surnames
Surnames of Indian origin
Hindustani-language surnames
Surnames of Hindustani origin
Hindu surnames